Mont Collon (3,637 m) is a mountain of the Swiss Pennine Alps in the canton of Valais. Its glaciated north face dominates the view south from the village of Arolla.

The ascent over the West Ridge, first made by A. Cust and F. Gardiner with the guides Peter Knubel and Johannes Knubel of St. Niklaus in the canton Valais on 3 August 1876, is now the normal route.

References

External links

Mont Collon on Hikr
Mont Collon on Summitpost

Mountains of the Alps
Alpine three-thousanders
Mountains of Valais
Pennine Alps
Mountains of Switzerland